Robert Wedderburn may refer to:

Robert Wedderburn (poet) (died 1553), Scottish poet 
Robert Wedderburn (radical) (1762–1835/36), British radical
Robert Wedderburn (statistician) (1947–1975), Scottish statistician